Lavinia Cohn-Sherbok (born Surrey, England) is a novelist, the author of numerous books about Judaism and 
Christianity, and was the Principal of West Heath Girls' School.

Biography
She was educated at Benenden School, Girton College, Cambridge, and the University of Kent, Canterbury. She taught at South Hampstead High School, London, King's School, Canterbury, and in 1988 became Principal of West Heath School, Sevenoaks, England.
 
She is the author of three best-selling comic campus novels, which lament the decline of British universities. In addition, she has written a number of books dealing with Judaism and Christianity. She is also Judaism editor of the Encyclopedia of World's Religions (Oxford University Press).

She is married to Dan Cohn-Sherbok.

Bibliography

 Lavinia and Dan Cohn-Sherbok, The American Jew, paperback ed., Harper Collins, 1994
 Lavinia and Dan Cohn-Sherbok, A Short History of Judaism, Paperback, ed., Oneworld, 1994
 
 Lavinia and Dan Cohn-Sherbok, A Short Reader of Judaism, Paperback ed., Oneworld, 1996
 Lavinia and Dan Cohn-Sherbok, A Short Introduction to Judaism, Paperback ed., Oneworld, 1997
 Lavinia Cohn-Sherbok, A History of Jewish Civilization, Hardback ed., Grange Books, 1997
 Lavinia Cohn-Sherbok, Routledge Who's Who in Christianity, Hardback ed., Routledge, 1998
 Lavinia and Dan Cohn-Sherbok, Encyclopedia of Judaism and Christianity, Paetback ed., DLT, 2006
 Lavinia Cohn-Sherbok, A Campus Conspiracy, Paperback ed., Impress Books, 2006
 Lavinia and Dan Cohn-Sherbok, What Do You Do When Your Parents Live Forever?, Paperback ed., 2007
 Lavinia Cohn-Sherbok, Degrees R'Us, Paperback ed., Impress Books, 2007
 Lavinia Cohn-Sherbok, The Whistleblower, Paperback ed., Impress Books, 2008
 Lavinia Cohn-Sherbok, The Campus Trilogy, Paperback ed., Impress Books, 2010

Lavinia Cohn-Sherbok, The Philosopher Cat, ebook, 2014

References

External links
"Book Review: Dan Cohn-Sherbok and Lavinia Cohn-Sherbok, An Encyclopedia of Judaism and Christianity, London, DLT, 2004", Glenn J. Morrison

Living people
1952 births
English women novelists
People from Surrey